NA-122 Lahore-VI is a newly-created constituency for the National Assembly of Pakistan. It mainly comprises the Lahore Cantonment Tehsil along with areas of Model Town Tehsil and Shalimar Tehsil.

Members of Parliament

2018-2022: NA-132 Lahore-X

Election 2018 

General elections were held on 25 July 2018.

See also
NA-121 Lahore-V
NA-123 Lahore-VII

References 

Lahore